The Gama Goat was a six-wheel drive semi-amphibious off-road vehicle originally developed for use by the US military in the Vietnam War. The Goat uses an articulated chassis, so that from distance it appears to be a four-wheel drive vehicle pulling a two-wheel trailer, but it is a single six-wheel vehicle with a four-wheel steering arrangement with the front and rear wheels turning in opposite directions. It was famous for its ability to travel over exceptionally rough and muddy terrain.

The vehicle's nickname came from two sources: "Gama" from the name of the inventor of its powered articulated joint, Roger Gamaunt, and "Goat" for its mountain goat-like off-road ability. Its military designation was M561, 6×6 tactical 1¼-ton truck. There was also an ambulance version known as the M792. The vehicle was replaced by a variety of Commercial Utility Cargo Vehicles (CUCV) and Humvees (HMMWV)

History
The concept for the vehicle came when the French Army reported that the United States Army trucks provided to them were woefully inadequate for the terrain in Vietnam. In 1959, ARPA (now known as DARPA) funded a research project called Project "Agile" to develop a new tactical truck for the Southeast Asia theatre, as well as other projects of interest to the then-looming Vietnam War.

Of 50 companies solicited for XM561 proposals, six entered the competition, including Clark, General Motors and LeTourneau Technologies, but on 15 March 1963, the research & development contract was awarded to Chance Vought division of LTV Aerospace, Dallas, Texas, best known for their combat aircraft (though, actually the company did have some experience in designing ground vehicles, particularly, a predecessor of Gama Goat, but they didn't have the truck assembly lines and production experience comparable to those of the mentioned car manufacturers). The principal competitor to the Goat was a tracked XM571 Articulated Utility Carrier developed by Canadair Ltd. of Montreal (yet another aerospace company,) which eventually lost the contest. The research and development contract for the Goat was completed by LTV at cost of about $8.7 million, over three times more expensive than when it had been awarded.

The vehicle weighed almost three times as much as originally requested by the military and specified by the operational requirements. Field testing had not been completed before the mass production order had been issued. During the field tests, it had not been able to go  without a breakdown.

Final construction of the vehicles was conducted by the Consolidated Diesel Electric Company (CONDEC) at their factory in Charlotte, North Carolina (on 11 June 1968, the Army awarded them a 3-year contract for 15,274 vehicles, 13,516 Army and 1,758 Marine Corps, at a total price of about $132.1 million, on the same day Detroit Diesel Division of General Motors received $30 million 3-year contract for the engines). CONDEC also had factories in Schenectady, New York, where the Gama Goat was originally manufactured, and in Greenwich, Connecticut, where the parts for the Gama Goat were produced. In the early 1960s, the company moved to Waterbury, Connecticut for a few years, then closed their plants in New York and Connecticut to move to Charlotte, North Carolina for cheaper labor and facilities.

The Gama Goat was replaced in the late 1980s by a variety of CUCVs and "Humvees" (HMMWV).

Description

Overall, some 14,274 Gama Goats were built at a cost of US$8,000 each (1965 dollars); this was considered quite high at the time. 12,516 were slated for the US Army and 1,758 for the USMC. While the Gama Goat had exceptional off-road ability, its quirky steering made it hard to handle on pavement, and its tendency to flounder in amphibious operations required drivers to have special training in order to operate it. This meant that it could not be the "general purpose" vehicle the Army had hoped for, and production was halted after the original contract expired.

The air-cooled engine used in the original prototypes overheated in use, and was replaced in the production vehicles with a liquid-cooled Detroit 3-53 Diesel engine. Due to the high-intensity noise from the two-stroke Diesel engine, the drivers required hearing protection. The double hull construction and complex articulated drivetrain made maintenance difficult (the lubrication order alone took around six hours). In service in Vietnam, Gama Goats would often be sent out ahead of other vehicles in order to arrive at their destination at the same time.

While technically listed as amphibious, the Gama Goat's swimming capability was limited to smooth water crossings of ponds, canals and streams due to the very low freeboard and the lack of a propeller. Propulsion in the water was supplied by the six spinning wheels, and bilge pumps were standard equipment. Drivers had to remember to close the hull's drain openings before swimming the vehicles. Some models had extra equipment installed that made them too heavy to swim, such as heavy-duty winches, communications shelters that made them top heavy, or radar gear.

It was designed to be air-transportable and droppable by parachute.

Typical problems and malfunctions
In May 1972 Fort Hood cited the following problems as a result of examining 566 vehicles:

Additional specifications

Articulation
 Roll at center axle: ± 15 degrees
 Roll at rear axle: ± 30 degrees
 Pitch at rear axle: ± 40 degrees
 Wall climb (vertical): 18 in (460 mm)
 Angle of approach: 62 degrees
 Angle of departure: 45 degrees
 Hump angle: 140 degrees

Suspension
 Front and rear independent coil springs at each wheel
 Center single leaf spring and swing axle

Steering system
 Type: Mechanical front and rear simultaneously operated
 Steering ratio: 24:1
 Turning radius: 29 ft (8.8 m)

Variants
 M561
 Cargo / personnel (eight troops) carrier
 TOW ATGM team carrier (originally intended to be a dedicated Anti-Tank variant with its own TOW launching platform)
 Communications (separate shelter installed in the cargo compartment)
 Mortar carrier
 Radar (counter-mortar/artillery system)
 Radar (FAAR System)
 M60 Machine gun and mount on passenger fender
 M792
 Ambulance

See also
 G-numbers
 List of "M" series military vehicles

References

 SNL G874

External links

 M561 Gama Goat page on olive-drab.com

Articulated vehicles
Military trucks of the United States
Off-road vehicles
Military vehicles introduced in the 1970s